Peoples Christian Academy (PCA) is a JK–12 private, Christian co-educational school in Markham, Ontario, Canada. It was established in 1971 as an elementary school.

Notable alumni
Jean Chamberlain Froese, obstetrician

References

External links 
 

Private schools in Toronto
Christian schools in Canada
Educational institutions established in 1971
1971 establishments in Ontario